The 2013 Vuelta a Burgos is the 35th edition of the Vuelta a Burgos, an annual bicycle race which tours the province of Burgos. The stage race is part of the 2013 UCI Europe Tour, and is classified as a 2.HC event.

Teams

16 teams were invited to participate in the tour: 9 UCI ProTeams, 5 UCI Professional Continental Teams and 2 UCI Continental Teams.

Route

Classification leadership

References

External links
Vuelta a Burgos homepage

Burgos
Vuelta a Burgos
Vuelta a Burgos